Laura Carter is a multi-instrumentalist musician from Athens, Georgia. She is able to play the clarinet, keyboard, percussion, violin, guitar, drums, french horn, and Zanzithophone.

She is most notably in the indie rock band Elf Power,  but has performed with a number of bands within the Elephant Six Collective, such as Nana Grizol, The Gerbils, Neutral Milk Hotel,  and Dixie Blood Moustache. She was also a founder of the Orange Twin Conservation Community as well as Orange Twin Records. She also dated Jeff Mangum for several years in the late 1990s until their break up in 2000.

Works
In the Aeroplane Over the Sea, Cooper, Kim, 2005 , 9780826416902

References

The Elephant 6 Recording Company artists
Living people
American multi-instrumentalists
Year of birth missing (living people)